Calicium robustellum is a crustose lichen that is found growing on trees in the Gascoyne region of Western Australia and in Queensland.

References

robustellum
Lichen species
Lichens described in 1861
Lichens of Australia
Taxa named by William Nylander (botanist)